German submarine U-581 was a Type VIIC U-boat of Nazi Germany's Kriegsmarine during World War II.

She carried out two patrols and sank one auxiliary warship of 364 GRT.

She was scuttled by her own crew after being pursued and attacked by a British warship near the Azores on 2 February 1942. After 20 years of search, in 2016, in a depth of approx. 900 m, the boat was discovered and filmed.

Design
German Type VIIC submarines were preceded by the shorter Type VIIB submarines. U-581 had a displacement of  when at the surface and  while submerged. She had two shafts and two  propellers.

U-581 was fitted with five  torpedo tubes (four fitted at the bow and one at the stern), fourteen torpedoes, one  SK C/35 naval gun, 220 rounds, and a  C/30 anti-aircraft gun. The boat had a complement of between forty-four and sixty.

Service history
The submarine was laid down on 25 September 1940 at Blohm & Voss, Hamburg as yard number 557, launched on 12 June 1941 and commissioned on 31 July under the command of Kapitänleutnant Werner Pfeifer.

She served with the 5th U-boat Flotilla from 31 July 1941 for training and moved to the 7th flotilla for operations until her loss, from 1 December 1941 until 2 February 1942.

First patrol
The boat departed Kiel on 13 December 1941, moved through the North Sea, negotiated the gap between the Faroe and Shetland Islands and entered the Atlantic Ocean. She docked at St. Nazaire on the French Atlantic coast on the 24 December 1941.

Second patrol and loss
For her second foray, U-581 left St. Nazaire on 11 January 1942. There is an element of doubt because the small warship was not reported missing until this date.

U-581 was sunk by depth charges from the British destroyer  near the Azores on 2 February 1942. Four men died; there were 41 survivors.

One of U-581s officers, Walter Sitek, swam six kilometres to land. He was repatriated to Germany through neutral Spain. Sitek survived the war.

Summary of raiding history

References

Notes

Citations

Bibliography

External links

 Video of the wrack

German Type VIIC submarines
U-boats commissioned in 1941
U-boats sunk in 1942
U-boats sunk by British warships
World War II submarines of Germany
1941 ships
World War II shipwrecks in the Atlantic Ocean
Ships built in Hamburg
Maritime incidents in February 1942